Bøicke Johan Rulffs Koren (1828 – 1909) was Norwegian Minister of the Navy in 1884.

References

1828 births
1909 deaths
Government ministers of Norway